Junior Jovais Galette (born March 27, 1988) is a Haitian born former American football outside linebacker. He played college football at Temple and Stillman. Galette was signed as an undrafted free agent with the New Orleans Saints. Galette has also played for the Washington Redskins.

High school
Junior Galette was born in Port-au-Prince, Haiti. After moving to the US, Galette started as linebacker for Ramapo High School in New Jersey. Following his sophomore season, Galette transferred as a scholarship athlete to  Saint Joseph Regional High School in Montvale, New Jersey in 2006, an all-boys school with a history of athletic success. Galette played for the football and basketball teams as a junior and senior.

During his first year at St. Joseph's as a junior, reunited with then St. Joseph seniors Devin and Jason McCourty, Galette led the football team to victory in its state Non-Public Group III title game, adding to the school's then-streak of six straight championship titles under head coach Tony Karcich. Galette continued to carry the St. Joseph football team, even without the graduated McCourty twins, in his senior season when Galette had 70 tackles and 12 sacks at linebacker and 10 touchdowns and 41 catches for 492 yards at wide receiver, capping the season with St. Joseph's seventh straight state Non-Public Group III championship title under head coach Tony Karcich. 

On February 1, 2006, Galette committed to play football for Temple University in Philadelphia, receiving a full scholarship.

College career

Freshman year 
Galette played in 11 games with nine starts as a true freshman at Temple, earning Freshman All-American recognition. That freshman season Galette made 52 tackles (32 solo), 5.5 tackles for loss, 1 sack, 1 pass breakup, and 1 block. In his college debut as a true freshman, Galette earned Defensive Player of the Game honors for his 9 tackles (5 solo) and 2.5 tackles for loss. Galette was ranked No. 2 on ESPN's college football plays of the week for his acrobatic punt block that led to a touchdown against BGSU. Galette lettered his freshman year at Temple.

Sophomore year 
In his sophomore year at Temple, Galette played in all 12 games with 4 starts at defensive end. Galette finished his sophomore season with 41 tackles, 11.5 tackles for loss, 7.5 sacks, 2 forced fumbles, and 1 pass breakup, leading the Temple Owls in tackles for loss and sacks. His 7.5 sacks ranked 4th among all Mid-Atlantic Conference players.  Galette was named Defensive Player of the Game for Temple's win over Miami, in which he led the defense with 6 tackles, 3 sacks, and a forced fumble. Galette was named Mid-Atlantic Conference Defensive Player of the Week (October 22, 2007). Galette lettered his sophomore year at Temple.

Junior year 
Galette continued to lead Temple's defense in his junior year, starting at defensive end. Galette finished his junior season with 46 tackles, a team-best 10 tackles for loss, a team-best 7.5 sacks, three break-ups, a hurry, and a forced fumble. In Temple's win over Navy on November 1, 2008, Galette led the Owls with a career-high 11 tackles, including 6 solo takedowns and a break-up, holding Navy to its lowest point total in 4 years. Galette was named Defensive Player of the Game against Navy and Central Michigan. Galette earned Temple Athlete of the Week honors for his performance against Ohio. Galette was honored with Second-team All-Mid-Atlantic Conference in 2008. Galette lettered his junior year at Temple.

Following his junior year, Galette was dismissed from the team for making "boneheaded mistakes" and for hosting a cousin who was arrested for stealing a laptop computer.

Senior year 
Galette transferred to Stillman College in Tuscaloosa, Alabama for his senior year. Galette was honored as a First-team All-American for his senior year performance at Stillman and was invited to participate in the NFL's rookie combine.

Professional career

New Orleans Saints
Galette was not drafted in the 2010 draft and signed with the Saints as a free agent. His energetic play made him a fan favorite during the preseason, and after he blocked a punt and registered two sacks in the Saints' final preseason game, Galette was selected for the Saints' 53-man regular season roster in 2010.

In the 2013 season, Galette signed a 3-year deal worth up to 9 million dollars. Galette became the team's regular starter at outside linebacker under new defensive coordinator Rob Ryan and posted a breakout season with a team-high 12 sacks.

On September 3, 2014, Galette signed a four-year contract extension worth $41.5 million. He was selected by teammates as one of the defensive team captains for the 2014 season and played all 16 of the Saints' games that season and ended up getting 45 total tackles, 10 sacks, and 3 forced fumbles. On July 24, 2015, Galette was officially released from the team.

Washington Redskins
On July 31, 2015, Galette signed a one-year contract with the Washington Redskins. On August 26, after completing training camp, it was announced that he tore his left Achilles tendon a week prior to the first game of the season  and would spend the entire 2015 season on the injured reserve list. He was placed on the injured reserve list on August 31. On November 16, 2015, Galette was suspended for two weeks for violating the league's personal conduct policy, coming from the domestic violence incident back in January.

Galette rehabbed the left Achilles and signed a one-year, up to $4 million deal for the upcoming 2016 season on March 15, 2016. It was announced on July 25 that Galette tore his right Achilles tendon and missed the entire 2016 season. Galette rehabbed again, and signed another deal with Washington, agreeing to play in 2017 for the veterans minimum. Galette outperformed the minimum deal, recording 3 sacks and ranking 3rd in the NFL in quarterback pressure rate, as a sub-rusher appearing in all 16 games. 

On February 1, 2017, Galette re-signed with the Redskins on another one-year contract. Galette did not appear on Washington's injury list at all during the 2017 season. Following the 2017 season in which Galette got 3 sacks, Washington withdrew its offer to Galette after disagreements over salary.

NFL career statistics

References

External links
New Orleans Saints bio
Washington Redskins bio

1988 births
Living people
New Orleans Saints players
Washington Redskins players
Haitian emigrants to the United States
Haitian players of American football
Temple Owls football players
Stillman Tigers football players
Sportspeople from Port-au-Prince
Sportspeople from Bergen County, New Jersey
Players of American football from New Jersey
Saint Joseph Regional High School alumni
American football outside linebackers
American football defensive ends